Herning station ( or Herning Banegård) is the main railway station serving the city of Herning in Jutland, Denmark.

Herning station is an important railway junction where the Vejle-Holstebro Line and the Skanderborg-Skjern Line cross each other. The station was opened in 1877 with the opening of the Silkeborg-Herning section of the Skanderborg-Skjern Line. It offers direct InterCityLyn services to Copenhagen and Struer operated by DSB as well as regional train services to Aarhus, Fredericia, Esbjerg and Thisted operated by Arriva.

See also
 List of railway stations in Denmark

References

Citations

Bibliography

External links

 Banedanmark – government agency responsible for maintenance and traffic control of most of the Danish railway network
 DSB – largest Danish train operating company
 Arriva – British multinational public transport company operating bus and train services in Denmark
 Danske Jernbaner – website with information on railway history in Denmark

Railway stations opened in 1877
Railway stations opened in 1906
Railway stations opened in 1979
Railway stations in the Central Denmark Region
Herning
Railway stations in Denmark opened in the 20th century

Railway stations in Denmark opened in the 19th century